Norman George Lorimer Hunter (23 November 1899 – 23 February 1995) was a British writer of children's literature. He is particularly known for creating the Professor Branestawm book series.

Early life
Hunter was born in Sydenham, England, on 23 November 1899. He attended Beckenham County School for Boys (later known as Beckenham and Penge Grammar School and then Langley Park School for Boys). He left school to volunteer for service in the London Irish Rifles in the First World War.

Career
After the war Hunter became an advertising copywriter. In the 1930s he performed as a stage magician in Bournemouth. He also wrote popular books on writing for advertising, brain-teasers and conjuring, among many other topics, but his best-known works were about the character Professor Branestawm, originally written for radio. The first book, The Incredible Adventures of Professor Branestawm, was published in hardback in 1933 with illustrations by W. Heath Robinson; the second, Professor Branestawm's Treasure Hunt in 1937 with drawings by James Arnold. George Adamson illustrated the reissue of Professor Branestawm's Treasure Hunt in 1966, and when Norman Hunter brought out his third book in the series in 1970 after a gap of more than thirty years, Adamson provided the illustrations. Two further Professor Branestawm titles were then published with Adamson's drawings.  Other artists were to provide illustrations for later books in the series: Gerald Rose; David Hughes; Jill McDonald, and Derek Cousins. Many of the books were reissued in Puffin Books, The Incredible Adventures of Professor Branestawm under Eleanor Graham's editorship in 1946, and many others under Kaye Webb's in the 1960s and 1970s.

Hunter returned to London during the Second World War and lived on a boat on the Thames. In 1949 he went to work in South Africa and stopped writing fiction. After his retirement in 1970, he once again returned to London, where Thames Television had just produced an eight-part TV series, Professor Branestawm. He continued writing in his retirement and his last book was published in 1983.

Works
(Incomplete):
 Simplified Conjuring for All: a collection of new tricks needing no special skill or apparatus for their performance with suitable patter, C. Arthur Pearson (1923)
 Advertising Through the Press: a guide to press publicity, Sir I. Pitman & Sons (1925)
 New and Easy Magic : a further series of novel magical experiments needing no special skill or apparatus for their performance with suitable patter, C. Arthur Pearson (1925)
 The Bad Barons of Crashbania: Vol. 42, Continuous Stories, Jolly Books (Blackwell, 1932), illustrated by Eve Garnett 
 The Incredible Adventures of Professor Branestawm, John Lane (1933), illustrated by W. Heath Robinson
 New Conjuring without Skill, Bodley Head (1935)
 Professor Branestawm's Treasure Hunt, John Lane (1937), illustrated by James Arnold; Bodley Head (1966), illustrated by George Adamson
 Larky Legends (1938), republished as The Dribblesome Teapots and Other Incredible Stories (1973)
 Successful Conjuring for Amateurs, Pearson (c.1951)
 The Puffin Book of Magic (1968), republished as Norman Hunter's Book of Magic, Bodley Head (1974)
 The Peculiar Triumph of Professor Branestawm, Bodley Head (1970), illustrated by George Adamson
 The Dribblesome Teapots and Other Incredible Stories (1971), illustrated by Fritz Wegner
 Professor Branestawm Up the Pole, Bodley Head (1972), illustrated by George Adamson
 Professor Branestawm's Dictionary, Bodley Head (1973), with cover by George Adamson
 The Frantic Phantom and Other Incredible Stories (1973), illustrated by Geraldine Spence
 Wizards Are A Nuisance, BBC (1973)
 Professor Branestawm's Great Revolution, Bodley Head (1974), illustrated by David Hughes; Puffin (1977), illustrated by George Adamson
 The Home-made Dragon and Other Incredible Stories (1974), illustrated by Fritz Wegner
 Dust up at the Royal Disco: and Other Stories (1975), illustrated by Fritz Wegner
 Long Live Their Majesties (1975)
 Professor Branestawm's Compendium of Donundrums, Riddles, Puzzles, Brain Twiddlers and Dotty Descriptions, Bodley Head (1975)
 Professor Branestawm's Do-It-Yourself Handbook, Bodley Head (1976); Puffin (1979), illustrated by Jill McDonald
 Professor Branestawm Round the Bend, Bodley Head (1977), illustrated by Derek Cousins
 Vanishing Ladies, and Other Magic, Bodley Head (1978), illustrated by Jill McDonald
 Professor Branestawm's Perilous Pudding, Bodley Head (1979), illustrated by Derek Cousins
 The Best of Branestawm, Bodley Head (1980), with illustrations by George Adamson, Derek Cousins, W. Heath Robinson and Jill McDonald
 Sneeze and Be Slain and Other Incredible Stories (1980)
 Professor Branestawm and the Wild Letters, Bodley Head (1981), illustrated by Gerald Rose
 Professor Branestawm's Pocket Motor Car, Bodley Head (1981), illustrated by Gerald Rose
 Professor Branestawm's Mouse War, Bodley Head (1982), illustrated by Gerald Rose
 Professor Branestawm's Building Bust-Up, Bodley Head (1982), illustrated by Gerald Rose
 Count Bakwerdz on the Carpet and Other Incredible Stories (1982), illustrated by Babette Cole
 Professor Branestawm's Crunchy Crockery, Bodley Head (1983), illustrated by Gerald Rose
 Professor Branestawm's Hair-Raising Idea, Bodley Head (1983), illustrated by Gerald Rose

References

External links
 
 BBC-H2G2 
 Books at Random
 
  (previous page of browse report, under 'Unter, Norman, 1899–' without '1995')

1899 births
1995 deaths
British children's writers
People from Sydenham, London
Military personnel from London
British Army personnel of World War I
London Irish Rifles soldiers